Devil's Lapful is an archaeological site in Northumberland, England, in Kielder Forest about  south-east of Kielder. The site, a Neolithic long cairn, is a scheduled monument.

Description
The cairn is one of few surviving long cairns in Northumberland. It is on the south-west slope of a hill, and is orientated north-north-east to south-south-west. There has been some later quarrying to make a sheep fold, which is next to the cairn on the north-west.

Monuments such as this are thought to date from the Early to Middle Neolithic (about 3400–2400 BC); they were probably burials sites for a local community over several generations.

References

Scheduled monuments in Northumberland
Archaeological sites in Northumberland
Barrows in England